The Yellow Hills are a mountain range in Washoe County, Nevada.  They are located within the East Fork High Rock Canyon Wilderness.

References 

Mountain ranges of Washoe County, Nevada
Mountain ranges of Nevada